Branica may refer to the following places:
Branica, Kuyavian-Pomeranian Voivodeship (north-central Poland)
Branica, Łódź Voivodeship (central Poland)
Branica, Masovian Voivodeship (east-central Poland)
Branica (river), a river in southwestern Slovenia
Branica - a part of Suszec, Silesian Voivodeship (south Poland)